Here Comes Sickness: The Best of the BBC Recordings is the third compilation album released by Mudhoney.

Track listings 
 "Here Comes Sickness" - 3:31
 "If I Think" - 3:30
 "By Her Own Hand" - 3:15
 "You Make Me Die" - 1:33
 "Judgement, Rage, Retribution and Thyme" - 2:25
 "Dissolve" - 3:00
 "Poisoned Water Poisons the Mind" - 2:11
 "Editions of You" - 2:38
 "Suck You Dry" - 2:27
 "You Got It (Keep It Out of My Face)" - 2:26
 "What Moves the Heart" - 3:08
 "In My Finest Suit" - 4:46
 "Judgement, Rage, Retribution and Thyme" - 2:19
 "This Gift" - 3:02
 "Into Your Schtik" - 3:44
 "Touch Me I'm Sick" - 2:40
 "Fuzzgun 91" - 1:54
 "Poisoned Water Poisons the Mind" - 2:06
 "When Tomorrow Hits" - 3:25
 "1995" - 4:55
 "Hate the Police" - 2:10

References

Mudhoney albums
BBC Radio recordings
2000 live albums
2000 compilation albums
Grunge compilation albums
Live grunge albums
Sub Pop compilation albums
Sub Pop live albums